Lycoperdina bovistae is a rare species beetle found in Great Britain.

The species takes its name from the puffball genus of mushrooms Lycoperdon, inside of which these beetles have been found living and breeding. They can be found in other species of fungi as well.  The species has been known since the late 1800s.

See also
 List of beetle species of Great Britain

References

Endomychidae
Beetles described in 1792